The 1953 Army Cadets football team represented the United States Military Academy in the 1953 college football season. Led by head coach Earl Blaik, the team finished with a record of 7–1–1. The Cadets won the Lambert-Meadowlands Trophy, awarded to the top college team in the East.

The Cadets had lost six players, including Freddie Myers, to academic ineligibility. The Cadets defeated Furman, 41–0, the team's first shutout since the 1951 scandal. After a loss to Northwestern, the Cadets were undefeated for the rest of the season. In a scoreless tie against Tulane, future Max McGee starred for the Green Wave. In the Army–Navy Game, Army's 20–7 victory over Navy was its first since 1949. The turning point of the season was an October victory over No. 7 Duke. The Blue Devils featured stars such as Red Smith and Worth (A Million) Lutz. Tommy Bell ran up the middle. Quarterback Pete Vann switched the ball to his left hand, and made a southpaw pass. Red Smith was tackled by Bob Mischak in the final minutes of the game. Mischak ran 73 yards to make the tackle catching up eight yards of separation to save a touchdown. Inspired by Mischak, Army held Duke inside the one yard line, took over on downs, and eventually won the game. "When Bob Mischak, who was posthumously enshrined in the Army/West Point Sports Hall of Fame in 2017, made that unlikely play, what Blaik called 'a marvelous display of heart and pursuit', the Army football team regained its soul." Direct quote from Maraness

Schedule

Personnel

New York Giants coaching vacancy
Before the end of the 1953 season, the New York Daily News had a headline in their paper that Vince Lombardi was the top candidate to become the Giants new head coach. Although Giants co-owner Wellington Mara was a classmate of Lombardi at Fordham University, the Giants were actually interested in Army head coach, Colonel Red Blaik. Blaik had declined the job, but recommended Lombardi, who was his offensive co-ordinator at Army. Despite being Red Blaik's top aide, Vince Lombardi was anxious and frustrated. Three other Army assistants, including Murray Warmath were now head coaches. In June, Lombardi had turned forty years old. Lombardi would be hired as the offensive co-ordinator for the 1954 season.

References

Army
Army Black Knights football seasons
Lambert-Meadowlands Trophy seasons
Army Cadets football